Henry Leonard Fosbrooke (11 September 1876 – 10 March 1950) was an Anglican priest in the 20th century.

He was educated at Clare College, Cambridge and ordained in 1900.  After curacies in Carlinghow and West Didsbury he held incumbencies in Pendleton, North Somercotes, St Michael's on Wyre before his appointment as Archdeacon of Blackburn; and Lytham St Annes afterwards when he was Archdeacon of Lancaster

References

1876 births
1950 deaths
Alumni of Clare College, Cambridge
Archdeacons of Blackburn
Archdeacons of Lancaster